"Try It on My Own" (titled "On My Own" for its single release) is a song by American recording artist Whitney Houston. It was written by Babyface, Jason Edmonds, Carole Bayer Sager, Aleese Simmons, and Nathan Walton for her fifth studio album Just Whitney (2002), with production handled by the former. A pop ballad, the song is about overcoming doubts or fears so a person can reach the point in their life where they can "try it on [their] own".

The song became the project's third single and was released on February 11, 2003. It received acclaim from critics as well as fans; most of them who named it as the album's highlight. Like "Whatchulookinat" and "One of Those Days" before it, "On My Own" was a modest success, topping the Billboard Hot Dance Music/Club Play chart and reaching the top ten on the US Adult Contemporary charts. A music video, directed by David LaChapelle, was released to promote the single. Houston performed "Try It on My Own" on an episode of the television series Boston Public ("Chapter 66"), which first aired in May 2003, and on the 2003 VH1 Divas Duets: An Honors Concert for the VH1 Save the Music Foundation.

Critical reception
Critical reception for "Try It on My Own" was generally positive. In a single review, Billboard said that "the third single 'Try It on My Own' is the best song on the disc, a classic Whitney ballad that pushes every diva button, from huge celestial notes to a creamy orchestral arrangement". Keysha Davis from BBC felt that the song marked "the most welcomed return on Just Whitney, with the melancholic [song] providing one of the album's highlights." Generally critical with the album, Entertainment Weeklys Tom Sinclair called the record a "treacly keyboards-and-strings big ballad." Slant Magazine felt that "Try It on My Own" was "the kind of syrupy ballad responsible for cookie-cutter star-makers like American Idols."

Music video
The music video for "Try It on My Own" was directed by David LaChapelle and shot at Overtown's historic Lyric Theater, one of the oldest African American owned theaters in Miami, Florida. It premiered on BET's 106 & Park on April 11, 2003. Later released as a DVD single by Arista, also featuring the "One of Those Days" video, it was certified gold for shipments of 25,000 units by the Recording Industry Association of America (RIAA) on September 22, 2003. Bobby Brown makes a cameo at the beginning of the video.

The music video can be interpreted as part of Houston's self-actualization during the late 1990s and early 2000s, when she repudiated the pop queen persona built under Clive Davis during the 1980s. Houston also uses the video, along with the song itself, to respond to criticism from the media and music industry at the time. It opens with music industry insiders waiting for Houston to appear, staring at their watches. As Houston starts singing, the panel is bewildered, holding up lyrics from "Over the Rainbow." This scene parodies her high-profile firing by Burt Bacharach from the 2000 Academy Awards ceremony for not singing "Rainbow" during rehearsals for the show. But she continues to sing "On My Own" as the insiders leave there in frustration due to Houston not following their prescribed formula. The video then cuts to Houston performing with a gospel choir in front of her adoring fans, giving their cheers through.

Chart performance
The song entered the Billboard Hot 100 on the week dated April 26, 2003 at number 99. In its fourth week it peaked at number 84, which was its peak position and stayed there for two weeks. It stayed on the charts for 12 weeks.

Cover versions
"Try It on My Own" is also the winning piece and debut single of Mau Marcelo, the winner of Philippine Idol in 2006. She sang the song twice during the show, first in the final performance night as Sony BMG's choice and second in the final results night when she was crowned the winner.

It was also recorded by Sheryn Regis, and is part of her album under Star Records entitled, What I Do Best. The song was again recorded by Canadian Idol contestant Toya Alexis for the 2003 Canadian Idol compilation album.

Track listings and formats

European CD maxi (82876 510082 3)
"On My Own" (radio edit) – 4:28
"On My Own" (MaUVe Remix) – 7:53
"On My Own" (Maurice's Nu Soul Radio Mix) – 4:23
"On My Own" (Pound Boys Radio Mix) – 4:42
"On My Own" (Thunderpuss Radio Mix) – 4:41

US remixes vinyl (82876 51973 1)
"On My Own" (Club Anthem Mix) – 10:09
"On My Own" (MaUVe Club Vocal) – 7:48
"On My Own" (Maurice's Nu Soul Mix) – 8:21
"On My Own" (Pound Boys Dub) – 7:35
"On My Own" (MaUVe Dub) – 6:20

US promo CD (82876 50138 2)
"Try It on My Own" (radio edit) – 4:28
"Try It on My Own" (Thunderpuss Radio Mix) – 4:40
"Try It on My Own" (Thunderpuss Radio Mix Instrumental) – 4:38

UK promo CD (82876 50666 2)
"On My Own" (radio edit) – 4:28

US Thunderpuss remixes vinyl/promo (82876 50140 1)
"Try It on My Own" (Club Anthem Mix) – 10:09
"Try It on My Own" (Tribe-A-Pella) – 7:58

US Mike Rizzo Remix vinyl/Promo (82876 52507 1)
"Try It on My Own" (Global Soul Club Mix) – 9:26
"Try It on My Own" (Global Soul Club Mix) – 9:26

US Thunderpuss Remixes 12" (82876 50538 1)
"Try It on My Own" (Club Anthem Mix) – 10:09
"Try It on My Own" (Tribe-A-Pella) – 7:58
"Try It on My Own" (Private Invite Mix) – 8:20
"Try It on My Own" (ThunderDUB) – 7:48

DVD single (EAN: 0828765115698)
"Try It on My Own" (video)
"One of Those Days" (video)

Other remixes and versions

 Dave-O Transformer Remix – 4:44
 J.D.'s Polarbabies Radio Edit – 4:35
 Maurice's Nu Soul Mix – 8:21
 Maurice's Nu Soul Radio Mix – 4:23
 Mike Rizzo Global Club Mix – 9:28
 Mike Rizzo Global Radio Mix – 3:58
 Mike Rizzo Global Acappella – 6:43
 MaUVe Club Vocal – 7:43
 MaUVe Dub – 6:18
 Seismic Crew's Vocal Radio Mix – 4:17
 Pound Boys Main Club Mix – 9:05
 Pound Boys Radio Mix – 4:42
 Pound Boys Dub – 7:35
 Thunderpuss Club Anthem Mix – 10:09
 Thunderpuss Private Invite Mix – 8:23
 Thunderpuss Radio Mix – 4:40
 Thunderpuss Radio Instrumental – 4:38
 Thunderpuss Tribe-A-Pella – 7:58
 ThunderDUB – 7:48

Personnel and credits
Credits adapted from album liner notes.

Whitney Houston: lead vocals
 Kenneth "Babyface" Edmonds: writer, producer, keyboards, drum programming, guitar and background vocals 
 Carole Bayer Sager, Jason Edmonds, Aleese Simmons and Nathan Walton: writers
 Kenya Ivey: background vocals
 Ricky Lawson: drums
 Michael Thompson: guitar
 Reggie Hamilton: bass
 Greg Phillinganes: piano
 Wayne Linsey: Rhodes
 Bill Meyers: strings arranger and conductor
 Paul Boutin: recording
 Edward Quesada et Jimmy Hoyson: assistant engineers
 Tommy Vicari: recording (strings)
 Jon Gass: mixing
 Josean Posey: assistant engineer (mixing)
 Ivy Skoff: production coordinator

Charts and certifications

Weekly charts

Year-end charts

Certifications
Video Single

See also
List of number-one dance singles of 2003 (U.S.)

References

2000s ballads
2003 singles
2002 songs
Whitney Houston songs
Pop ballads
Contemporary R&B ballads
Music videos directed by David LaChapelle
Soul ballads
Gospel songs
Songs written by Babyface (musician)
Songs written by Carole Bayer Sager